Lo Suk-ching, BBS, JP (born 22 June 1950, Hong Kong) is a Hong Kong politician. He was the member of the Legislative Council (1995–97) for the Election Committee and also the Provisional Legislative Council (1996–98). He was the chairman of the New Territories Association of Societies and member of the National People's Congress.

References

1950 births
Living people
Members of the Provisional Legislative Council
Delegates to the 9th National People's Congress from Hong Kong
Delegates to the 10th National People's Congress from Hong Kong
Delegates to the 11th National People's Congress from Hong Kong
New Territories Association of Societies politicians
HK LegCo Members 1995–1997
Hong Kong people of Hakka descent
People from Zengcheng
Members of the Selection Committee of Hong Kong